(The) Classic Album(s) Collection may refer to:

The Classic Albums Collection (Electric Light Orchestra album)
The Classic Albums Collection 1974-1983 2013 by Kansas (band)
Classic Album Collection, Vol. 1, Million Seller Songs
Classic Album Collection, Vol. 2, Get Together with Andy Williams